Hackamore (formerly Jaquina) is an unincorporated community in Modoc County, California.

A post office operated at Hackamore from 1903 (having been transferred from Stobie) to 1904.

References

Unincorporated communities in California
Unincorporated communities in Modoc County, California